"The Curtains in the House of the Metaphysician" is a poem from Wallace Stevens's first book of poetry, Harmonium. It was originally published in 1919, so it is in the public domain.

Interpretation

An image like the one in "Curtains" is the "crisp lettuce" that Stevens sought in a poem. The motions of curtains are associated with motions seen of an afternoon and the motions of transition to evening. These associations charge the scene with an air of mystery, leading the reader to a splendid vision of the firmament.

The poem is spare and says little, yet it shows a great deal about a perspective that could seem empty without the imagination's activity, which invests it with depth and ineffability. See "Gubbinal" and "The Snow Man" for other experiments in perspective.
  
Buttel is struck by "Stevens' fondness for the word 'motions', as an abstract word for the flux of the physical world as well as for the sympathetic movement of the mind". He also remarks that Stevens makes us experience the motion from afternoon to night "as a felt ambience".

Notes

References 

 Buttel, Robert. Wallace Stevens: The Making of Harmonium. 1967:
Princeton University Press.
 Stevens, Holly. Letters of Wallace Stevens. 1966: University of California Press.

1919 poems
American poems
Poetry by Wallace Stevens